Betta brownorum is a species of betta native to the island of Borneo in Indonesia and Malaysia. It is an inhabitant of peat swamps, where it occurs in very shallow waters.

References

brownorum
Fish of Asia
Taxa named by Kai-Erik Witte
Taxa named by Jürgen Schmidt (biologist)
Fish described in 1992